Angelo Genocchi (5 March 1817 – 7 March 1889) was an Italian mathematician who specialized in number theory.  He worked with Giuseppe Peano.  The Genocchi numbers are named after him.

Genocchi was President of the Academy of Sciences of Turin.

Notes

References
 Obituary in: 
 

19th-century Italian mathematicians
1817 births
1889 deaths